Slavianism or Slavism is a general term for Slavic culture, civilization and identity. It may refer to:

 Slavs, an Indo-European ethno-linguistic group
 Pan-Slavism, a political ideology
 Slavic culture, various cultures of Slavic Europe
 Slavic nationalism (disambiguation), various forms of nationalism
 Slavic Native Faith, a modern Pagan religion

See also
 
 Slavic (disambiguation)
 Slavia (disambiguation)
 Slavyansk (disambiguation)
 Slavyansky (disambiguation)